This is a list of castles and chateaux in the Czech Republic, organized by regions.

Central Bohemia (S)

Hradec Králové (H)

Karlovy Vary (K)

Liberec (L)

Moravia-Silesia (T)

Olomouc (M)

Pardubice (E)

Plzeň (P)

Prague (A)

South Bohemia (C)

South Moravia (B)

Ústí nad Labem (U)

Vysočina (J)

Zlín (Z)

See also
 List of castles in Europe
 List of castles

External links 
 Czech Republic - Manors, Castles, Historical Towns
 Hrady.cz 

Czech Republic
 
Castles